Orăști may refer to several villages in Romania:

 Orăști, a village in Poșaga Commune, Alba County
 Orăști, a village in Frumușani Commune, Călărași County